Live, Loud and Loose (1982–1986) is an album released by the rock band Loverboy in 2001. After the death of their original bassist Scott Smith, the band decided to release a live album. This album contains refurbished recorded live tracks from the band's intense touring from 1982 to 1986. It became quite popular with fans, but failed to break into the mainstream.

The compilation was produced by Matt Frenette, with the overall album being produced by Paul Dean.

Track listing

Personnel
Mike Reno - lead vocals
Paul Dean - guitar, backing vocals
Doug Johnson - keyboards, backing vocals
Scott Smith - bass
Matt Frenette - drums

Production
Paul Dean: Producer
Matt Frenette: Compilation Producer
Guy Charbonneau: Engineer
Biff Dawes: Engineer
Lynn Goldsmith: Cover Photo
Mark Wilder: Mastering
Patrick Glover: Assistant
Al Quaglieri: Compilation Producer
Howard Fritzson: Art Direction
Steve Newman: Design
Craig Waddell: Mastering
Dianne Spoto Shattuck: Packaging Manager

Note
 This album is dedicated in loving memory to Scott Smith: father, friend, bassist & bandmate... RIP!

References

Loverboy albums
2001 live albums
Sony Music Canada live albums